Bowen Hill is a small mountain chain made of two summits, the highest being 1765 feet. The summits are located in Central New York Region of New York located in the Town of Steuben in Oneida County, northwest of Steuben.

References

Mountains of Oneida County, New York
Mountains of New York (state)